The  is a Japanese manufacturer of servos, motion controllers, AC motor drives, switches and industrial robots. Their Motoman robots are heavy duty industrial robots used in welding, packaging, assembly, coating, cutting, material handling and general automation.

The company was founded in 1915, and its head office is located in Kitakyushu, Fukuoka Prefecture.
Yaskawa applied for a trademark on the term "Mechatronics" in 1969, it was approved in 1972.
The head-office, in Kitakyushu, was designed by the American architect Antonin Raymond in 1954.

The company is listed on the Tokyo and Fukuoka Stock Exchange and is a constituent of the Nikkei 225 stock index.

Products and Services
 Servo Drives and Machine Controllers
 AC Drives
 Robots
 Industrial robots for various industrial processes:  Selective Compliance Assembly Robot Arm (SCARA), collaborative robots
 System Engineering used in:
 Steel plants
 Social systems (water circulation, energy conservation, disaster prevention, mega-solar systems, hybrid electrical generation systems and energy management systems)
 Environment & energy (power generation equipment)
 Electrical power (electric power distribution equipment)
 Industrial electronics
 Information Technology
 Equipment for Energy Saving and Creation

Subsidiaries 
YASKAWA has business hubs in 29 countries around the world and with production bases in 12 countries including Japan. There are 81 subsidiaries and 24 affiliate companies across the globe. Some of these are:
 in the Americas: Yaskawa America, Inc., Yaskawa Canada Inc., Yaskawa Electrico do Brasil Ltda., Solectria Renewables LLC
 in Europe, Africa, Middle-East: Yaskawa Europe GmbH, Yaskawa Nordic AB, Yaskawa Southern Africa (Pty) Ltd, VIPA
 in Asia-Pacific: Yaskawa India Private Limited, Yaskawa Electric (China) Co., Ltd., Yaskawa Electric Korea Corporation, Yaskawa Electric Taiwan Corporation

References

External links

 Official global website 
 Yaskawa America, Inc. - Drives & Motion Division
 Yaskawa Europe GmbH
 Yaskawa India Private Limited
 Yaskawa Viet Nam, Inc 

Electronics companies of Japan
Robotics companies of Japan
Industrial robotics
Companies listed on the Tokyo Stock Exchange
Companies listed on the Fukuoka Stock Exchange
Companies based in Fukuoka Prefecture
Electronics companies established in 1915
Japanese companies established in 1915
Japanese brands
Kitakyushu
Companies established in 1981